Patricia Conway (born 16 January 1944) is a British archer. She competed in the women's individual event at the 1976 Summer Olympics.

References

1944 births
Living people
British female archers
Olympic archers of Great Britain
Archers at the 1976 Summer Olympics
Sportspeople from Birmingham, West Midlands
20th-century British women